Con Alma! is the second album led by saxophonist Charles McPherson recorded in 1965 and released on the Prestige label.

Reception

Allmusic awarded the album 4 stars with its review by Scott Yanow stating, "McPherson and Harris both have their share of fine solos, but Jordan generally takes honors on this set; he is the only musician who was looking beyond bop and playing in a more original style".

Track listing 
 "Eronel" (Thelonious Monk) – 7:06  
 "In a Sentimental Mood" (Duke Ellington, Manny Kurtz, Irving Mills) – 8:00  
 "Chasing the Bird" (Charlie Parker) – 7:12  
 "Con Alma" (Dizzy Gillespie) – 5:31  
 "I Don't Know" (Charles McPherson) – 8:19  
 "Dexter Rides Again" (Dexter Gordon, Bud Powell) – 8:10

Personnel 
Charles McPherson – alto saxophone
Clifford Jordan – tenor saxophone  
Barry Harris – piano
George Tucker – bass
Alan Dawson – drums

References 

Charles McPherson (musician) albums
1965 albums
Prestige Records albums
Albums produced by Don Schlitten
Albums recorded at Van Gelder Studio